The Headstone Museum, also known as the Harrow Museum, is the local history museum for the London Borough of Harrow in England.

Overview
The museum was established in 1986 and is located in the grounds of Headstone Manor; it tells the story of Harrow through its collections, exhibitions and buildings, detailing the significance of the historical site in which it is set as well as the people and wider area.

The Harrow Museum is made up of four historic buildings, which are all located in the grounds of Headstone Manor, records of which date back to 825 AD. All the buildings are listed, and the site as a whole is a Scheduled Ancient Monument.

Historic buildings

Headstone Manor

Built in 1310, the moated manor house known as Headstone Manor is the earliest surviving timber-framed building in Middlesex. Described as "one of the most interesting domestic complexes in the whole country", the fabric of Headstone Manor contains examples of work dating from the 14th, 17th and 18th centuries. Headstone Manor is a Grade I listed building.

Headstone Manor is surrounded by the only surviving filled moat in Middlesex. The moat is contemporary in date to the oldest part of the building, and was constructed as a status symbol to reflect the wealth of the Manor's owner.
The land on which Headstone Manor stands is recorded to have belonged to Wulfred, Archbishop of Canterbury, in 825AD. The construction of Headstone Manor began in c.1310, as revealed by the dendrochronological dating of the building's oldest timbers. John de Stratford, Archbishop of Canterbury, purchased even more land around the site in 1344 and used the site as his main residence in Middlesex. Headstone Manor remained in the ownership of the Archbishops of Canterbury until 1546, when it was surrendered to Henry VIII. Soon after, Henry VIII sold it to one of his court favourites, Edward North, and it remained in private ownership for almost four centuries.

The numerous owners of Headstone Manor made dramatic extensions and changes to the building, such as adding extra wings and changing the appearance of the interior and exterior of the house. Examples of this include the panelling of the great hall in 1631, and the addition of a fashionable brick façade in the 1770s, which gives Headstone Manor the appearance it has today.

The house is surrounded by a bridged moat, which is still filled with water. The moat is thought to be contemporary with the oldest parts of the house and was probably built to demonstrate the wealth and condition of the Archbishop of Canterbury, John de Stratford.

Over time, Headstone Manor fell into a state of disrepair, and much of its surrounding land was sold off. In 1925 Hendon Rural District Council bought the site. It then passed into the control of the London Borough of Harrow after local government reorganisation. After years of increasing dilapidation, the decision was made to turn the site into the home of Harrow Museum, which officially opened in 1986. The first stage of restoration at Headstone Manor began in the autumn of 2004, focusing on the oldest parts of the building.

The Great Barn

Headstone Manor was a working farm, and consequently was surrounded by many ancient farm buildings. By the early 20th century, the majority of these buildings had fallen into a state of disrepair and were eventually destroyed. Only two remain, and by far the most impressive is the farm building now known as the Great Barn (formerly referred to as the Tithe Barn).

Built in 1506 on the orders of the then Archbishop of Canterbury, the Grade II* listed Great Barn has a framework made entirely from English Oak, measuring an impressive 43 metres long and nine metres high. Originally, the Barn would have been mainly used by the tenant farmer of Headstone to store grains and stable horses, with a few bays reserved for the use of the Archbishop. Despite its previous name, it was never used to store tithes.

By the 1920s, the condition of the Barn was very poor. It was not until a major restoration project carried out by the London Borough of Harrow in the 1970s that the Great Barn was bought back to its former state of glory. The Great Barn was converted to provide the facilities needed for an active museum. The resulting rich brown weather-boarded building with ancient tiled roof formed the first usable building of Harrow Museum when it opened in 1986.

In 2014 a programme of restoration began, initially transforming the Great Barn into a function space.

The Small Barn

Excavations at the site of the Small Barn have revealed fragments of prehistoric and Roman pottery, indicating that the site of that is now Harrow Museum was inhabited thousands of years ago. Archaeological excavation has also shown that the foundations of the Small Barn date back to the 14th century, making it contemporary with the first phases of the building of Headstone Manor house and the moat.

The Small Barn stands opposite the giant Great Barn, and originally would have been two buildings standing end to end. Re-roofed as one with a drainage channel through the middle, it is likely to have been used to house livestock. It is thought that a series of structures have stood on the site, though most of the wood today appear to be from the same period as the early 16th century Great Barn.

In the mid-1970s, the Small Barn was almost destroyed by a fire. After 20 years being covered by a protective plastic canopy, the burnt out skeleton of the building was finally restored. The Small Barn is a Grade II listed building and re-opened in autumn 2017, with archaeological exhibitions and a film.

The Granary

The Grade II listed Granary is the only museum structure that was not originally built as one of the farm buildings of Headstone Manor, having been originally constructed about a mile away in Pinner Park Farm. After becoming redundant and falling into a dilapidated condition it was carefully restored, before being moved to the Harrow Museum site in 1991.

Dating from the late 18th century, the Granary was actually a cattle feed store. Although it only has a ground floor and a first floor, the building has an extraordinary number of windows to the upper stories, making it a rather puzzling building. Originally the building would have been longer, but one end stood in damp ground and rotted away, reducing the Granary to its present size.

The Granary building fits well into the context of the Harrow Museum site. It was opened to the public in 1992, and re-opened as a learning space after Heritage Lottery Fund restoration works in autumn 2017.

Collections
As a local history museum, the Harrow Museum Collection is made up of over 15,000 objects and artefacts that are linked to the Harrow area.

The Collection focuses on the social and industrial past of Harrow and its residents. The strength of the collections lies with Harrow's industrial past, including an extensive collection from the Eastman Kodak factory, the Whitefriars Glass factory, and the Hamilton's paint factory. In addition, Harrow Museum has an extensive collection of archaeological objects, ranging from pre-history to the recent past.

See also
 Grade I and II* listed buildings in Harrow

References

External links
 

1986 establishments in England
Museums established in 1986
Museums in the London Borough of Harrow
Local museums in London
Barns in England
Open-air museums in England
Grade I listed buildings in the London Borough of Harrow
Grade II* listed buildings in the London Borough of Harrow
Grade II listed buildings in the London Borough of Harrow
Archives in the London Borough of Harrow